The 2009 Little Caesars Pizza Bowl was an NCAA-sanctioned bowl game (previously the Motor City Bowl game) played at 1:00 PM EST on December 26, 2009, at Ford Field in Detroit, Michigan and aired on ESPN.

The game was the 13th installment of the bowl game played in Detroit. The Marshall Thundering Herd of Conference USA defeated the Ohio Bobcats, champion of the East Division of the Mid-American Conference, 21–17, giving the Thundering Herd a seven-win season. A lack of eligible teams from the Big Ten Conference made a spot available in the game for Marshall.

Line judge Sarah Thomas became the first woman to officiate a college football bowl game.

Teams
The teams were both members of the Mid-American Conference from 1997 to 2004 and were meeting for the 53rd time. Marshall and Ohio planned to renew their rivalry in 2010.

This marked Ohio's first trip to the Little Caesars Pizza Bowl and only the fourth time in the school's history that they appeared in a bowl game. Marshall was playing in its fifth Little Caesars Pizza Bowl but first since joining Conference USA, as they had qualified for the then-Motor City Bowl in its first four playings as MAC Champions. In those four games Marshall had only lost once.  Marshall was coached by its defensive coordinator/interim head coach, Rick Minter.  Minter, who was previously the head coach for the Cincinnati Bearcats took over as Marshall's temporary head coach after  Mark Snyder resigned at the conclusion of the regular season.

Game summary
Ohio wore their home green jerseys and Marshall wore their white away jerseys.

Defense dominated the game as Marshall was held to 275 yards of total offense, while Ohio only managed 123, including just 12 yards rushing.  Ohio also recovered a fumble for a touchdown and Marshall returned a punt for a score.  Marshall's Martin Ward was named the game's MVP as he rushed for 72 yards on nine carries and recorded two touchdowns.  Theo Scott threw for 111 yards and a touchdown pass to lead the Bobcats.

The bowl game drew a record-low 30,311 fans. Just two years before, more than twice as many people watched Purdue beat Central Michigan in Detroit. The game attracted fewer than 40,000 only once before when Marshall beat Louisville in 1998 at the Pontiac Silverdome.

Scoring summary

References

Little Caesars Pizza Bowl
Little Caesars Pizza Bowl
Marshall Thundering Herd football bowl games
Ohio Bobcats football bowl games
Little Caesars Pizza Bowl
Little Caesars Pizza Bowl
Little Caesars Pizza Bowl